The Austrian Service Abroad is a non-profit organization founded by Andreas Hörtnagl, Andreas Maislinger and Michael Prochazka in 1998, which sends young Austrians to work in partner institutions worldwide serving Holocaust commemoration in form of the Gedenkdienst, supporting vulnerable social groups and sustainability initiatives in form of the Austrian Social Service and realizing projects of peace within the framework of the Austrian Peace Service. Its services aim at the permanence of life on earth. The Austrian Service Abroad carries and promotes the idea of the House of Responsibility for the birthplace of Adolf Hitler in Braunau am Inn. The Austrian Service Abroad is the issuer of the annually conferred Austrian Holocaust Memorial Award. The program is funded by the Austrian government.

Origin  
The Austrian Service Abroad has its origin in the acknowledgement of the Austrian government, in particular by chancellor Franz Vranitzky in 1991, regarding the Austrian people's share of responsibility for the crimes committed by National Socialism during WWII.  The Austrian Service Abroad is an outflow of this recognition. The initiative initially started in form of the Gedenkdienst in 1992. In 1998 the organization Austrian Service Abroad was founded, adding the Austrian Social Service and the Austrian Peace Service.

General information

The organisation provides young male Austrians a government funded alternative to the compulsory military service by sending them to institutions of Holocaust commemoration, social service or peace promotion for a time period of at least 10 months. In addition, it also provides volunteers (male & female) a platform to work in its partner institutions without age limitations for 6 to 12 months, while being financially supported by the Austrian government for their work abroad.

Before being sent out as Austrian Servants Abroad the candidates undergo a preparation period (typically 1,5 years) during which they are educated on the subject-matter relevant to their place of assignment. In addition, they are also being trained with professional skills via contributing to the work-flow of the organization.

Once a year the president of Austria and the Austrian Ministry of Foreign Affairs invite all Austrian Servants Abroad of the year before departure for a reception at the Hofburg and the Ministry of Foreign Affairs respectively. The Austrian Servants Abroad are commonly referred to as "little ambassadors of Austria".

The Austrian Service Abroad is headquartered in Innsbruck and has an office in Vienna. In addition, upcoming Austrian Servants Abroad physically meet monthly in the capital of each of the 9 federal states of Austria.

The Austrian Service Abroad is non-confessional and non-partisan.

The Austrian Service Abroad cooperates with the Austrian Ministry of Foreign Affairs. The servants abroad are obliged to cooperate with the Austrian embassy in their respective host country.

Examples of partner institutions / organizations are the Auschwitz Jewish Center in Oświęcim, Poland, Yad Vashem in Jerusalem, Israel, the Simon Wiesenthal Centre in Los Angeles and the World Jewish Congress in New York, United States, the Center of Jewish Studies Shanghai in Shanghai, China, the Russian Research and Educational Holocaust Center in Moscow, Russia, the Jewish Holocaust Centre in Melbourne, Australia, the Tom Lantos Institute in Budapest, Hungary, the Ashraya Initiative for Children in Pune, India and A chance for children in Zigoti, Uganda.

The Austrian Service Abroad is also a partner of the Israeli Volunteer Association partnering on the initiative Understanding Israel in conjunction with the Austrian Ministry of Social Affairs.

Originally named 'Association for Services Abroad' it was renamed to Austrian Service Abroad in 2006. Since 2001 Michael Prochazka is part of its managing committee.

Vision Statement
A peaceful and socially humane world rooted in responsibility derived from the lessons of history.

Mission Statement
Educating young people on the subjects of memoria (remembrance), misericordia (mercy) and pax (peace), derived from and aimed at responsibility, and sending them to serve at worldwide partner institutions remembering the crimes of Nazism and commemorating the victims of the Holocaust, supporting vulnerable social groups and realizing projects of peace, while being financially supported by their government.

Legal Framework
The Austrian Service Abroad is funded and supervised by the Austrian Ministry of Social Affairs and subject to the Austrian Federal Act on the Promotion of Voluntary Services (Bundesgesetz zur Förderung von freiwilligem Engagement.)

Types of service

Austrian Service Abroad offers three different types:

Gedenkdienst (Österreichischer Gedenkdienst) 
Gedenkdienst is the concept of facing and taking responsibility for the darkest chapters of one's own country's history while ideally being financially supported by one's own country's government to do so. Gedenkdienst has the acknowledgment of, the apology for and the assumption of responsibility for atrocities done by one's own country's society in history as its basis. Gedenkdienst is about honesty with one's country's past and the desire to rectify past wrongs. Gedenkdienst is about providing people of the perpetrator's side a platform for education and going to the victim's side to serve the remembrance of the evil done and the commemoration of its victims. Gedenkdienst is about peace on the basis of honesty regarding the past.

The program was founded in 1992 and has been a part of the association Austrian Service Abroad since 1998. It remembers the crimes of Nazism and commemorates its victims. Gedenkdiener work for Holocaust remembrance memorials and institutions as well as research facilities. Examples are the Simon Wiesenthal Center in Los Angeles, the World Jewish Congress in New York, the Jewish Museum Berlin, the Auschwitz Jewish Center in Oswiecim or Yad Vashem in Jerusalem.

In addition, Austrian Holocaust Memorial servants are also sent to serve in former refuge countries of the victim groups persecuted by the Nazis, for example to the Casa Stefan Zweig in Petrópolis (Brazil) or the Center of Jewish Studies Shanghai. 

The program annually confers the Austrian Holocaust Memorial Award to actors "who have shown special endeavors for the memory of the Shoah".

Austrian Social Service (Österreichischer Sozialdienst) 
Austrian social servants serve vulnerable social groups, support the economic and social development of the host country and contribute to environmental protection. They are active in projects relating to street-children, homeless people, educational projects and children villages, elderly and handicapped care, medical care, etc.

An example type of project is the improvement of drinking water supplies in countries of the Third World. Andreas Daniel Matt, the first Austrian social servant was sent in 2004 to a SOS children's village in Lahore (Pakistan).

Since October 1998 hundreds of Austrian social servants have been assigned mainly to countries in Central and South America, Africa and Asia. 

Since 2018 the Austrian Service Abroad also partakes in the program Understanding Israel, sending young Austrians to do social service at child-care places and handicapped-care facilities in the state of Israel in cooperation with the Israeli Volunteer Association.

Austrian Peace Service (Österreichischer Friedensdienst) 
Austrian Peace servants are stationed in organizations serving the achievement and protection of peace in connection with (armed) conflicts. They work, for example, at the Hiroshima Peace Culture Foundation in Japan, the John Rabe House in Nanjing, China, the Dayton International Peace Museum in Ohio, USA, the Peace Palace in The Hague and the Centre for Peace, Nonviolence and Human Rights in Osijek, Croatia.

Awards
On September 3 2019 the Austrian Service Abroad received the John Rabe Peace Award, issued by the John Rabe Communication Centre, for the contributions of the Austrian Service Abroad for peace between different cultures.

International Advisory Board

The International Council is the advisory arm for the executive committee of the Austrian Service Abroad regarding all matters of the respective country.

: Erika Rosenberg
: Paul R. Bartrop
: Eli Tauber
: Alberto Dines✝
: Walter Absil✝
: Roland Spendlingwimmer
: Branko Lustig✝
: Michel Cullin✝, Beate Klarsfeld
: Gabriela von Habsburg
: Thomas Rabe
: György Dalos
: Barbara Nath-Wiser
: Ben Segenreich
: Camilla Brunelli
: Daniel Janetschek
: Eugene Sensenig
: Festus Imarhiagbe
: Władysław Bartoszewski✝, Konstanty Gebert
: Ilya Altman
: Charles M. Huber
: Tali Nates
: Gerald Nagler
: Anita Winter
: Ladislaus Löb✝
: Randolph M. Bell, Anna Rosmus
Ernst Florian Winter✝, former Chairman

Domestic Advisory Board
The national council is the domestic advisory arm for the executive committee of the Austrian Service Abroad.
 Hubert Achleitner, musician
 Emil Brix, diplomat & historian and director of the Diplomatic Academy of Vienna
 Marko Feingold✝, Holocaust survivor and former president of the Jewish community in Salzburg
 Paul Lendvai, Journalist
 Ernst Löschner, Founder of Alpine Peace Crossing
 Manfred Nowak, human rights lawyer
 Eva Nowotny, former Austrian ambassador to the United States, France and the United Kingdom
 Wolfgang Petritsch, diplomat and former High Representative for Bosnia and Herzegovina
 Michael Schnitzler, ecologist and musician
 Renée Schroeder, researcher and university professor
 Danielle Spera, director of the Jewish Museum Vienna
 Richard Trappl, sinologist, director of the Confucius Institute in Vienna and professor at the University of Vienna
 August Zirner, American-Austrian actor

Partners

The US is currently the country with the largest number of places offered for Holocaust Memorial Service. Holocaust Museums and Memorial Institutions like the Simon Wiesenthal Center and the Survivors of the Shoah Visual History Foundation in Los Angeles received several Holocaust Memorial Servants since the 1990s.

At present, Austrian Service Abroad sends young Austrians to the following partner institutions:

Buenos Aires - Center for homeless children and adolescents

Melbourne - Jewish Holocaust Museum and Research Centre
The Jewish Holocaust Museum and Research Centre considers the finest memorial to all victims of racist policies to be an educational program which aims to combat anti-Semitism, racism and prejudice in the community and foster understanding between people. The Austrian Holocaust Memorial Service representatives work in different fields and areas of responsibility, undertaking translation, research, working in the library and on the museum’s database, and helping with exhibitions and events.

Minsk - Belarusian Children's Hospice
Minsk - Dietski Dom No. 6 (Children's Home No. 6)
Minsk - Kindergarten for Children with Special Needs

Brussels - Centre for Historical Research and Documentation on War and Contemporary Society
Brussels - European Union of Jewish Students

Sarajevo - Phoenix Initiative

Alagoinhas - Associacao Lar Sao Benedito
Lauro de Freitas - Community Centre Christ Liberator
 Petrópolis - Casa Stefan Zweig
Rio de Janeiro - Center for Justice and International Law (CEJIL)

Sofia - Schalom - Organization of the Jews in Bulgaria

Montreal - Holocaust Memorial Centre
The Montreal Holocaust Memorial Centre was founded by a group of Holocaust survivors and opened to the public in 1979. Through its Museum, its commemorative programs and its educational initiatives, the Centre aims to alert the public to the dangers of anti-Semitism, bigotry and hate, while promoting respect for diversity and the sanctity of human life. The field of activity of an ‘Austrian Holocaust Memorial Volunteer’ at the Montreal Holocaust Memorial Centre is very diverse. The duties range from helping with tasks in the office, to translations (German-English) as well as to research assistance or to the description and digitization of collection artefacts. Another essential part of the work schedule is covering the museum front desk. In doing so, the volunteer interacts with Holocaust survivors, students, teachers and visitors to coordinate tours and to ensure a proper daily routine. Furthermore, the volunteer is involved in several projects and events including “Witness to History”, “A Bar &Bat Mitzvah to Remember”, “Kristallnacht Commemoration”, and others.
Montreal - Holocaust Education and Genocide Prevention Foundation
The Austrian Holocaust Memorial Servant at the former “Kleinmann Family Foundation” which is now entitled Holocaust Education and Genocide Prevention Foundation digitalizes and archives artifacts, documents and photographs as well as maintains and improves the database and the website. The volunteer gives presentations in high schools and colleges about the Holocaust and Moral Responsibility. The servant also interviews Holocaust survivors for "Oral History"-projects.
Toronto  - Sarah and Chaim Neuberger Holocaust Education Centre / Hillel Canada
This internship is a joint partnership between Jewish Federation of Canada-United Israel Appeal of Canada's University campus Hillel Canada and United Jewish Appeal Federation of Greater Toronto's Sarah and Chaim Neuberger Holocaust Education Centre. The intern's primary responsibilities will be to complete projects that have been assigned by the two agencies. The intern will be supporting students in developing new education programs in terms of the Holocaust with the center and on university campuses. Other tasks are: support for the organization of the education trip to Vienna for Canadian, Jewish students, outreach to, and maintaining connection with local schools in terms of Holocaust education-related activities.

Beijing - Beijing International Peace Culture Foundation
Shanghai - Center of Jewish Studies
The Center of Jewish Studies Shanghai (CJSS) was established in 1988 as an institute of the Shanghai Academy of Social Sciences, the oldest and second biggest political think tank in PR China.Under Prof. PAN Guang’s leadership the CJSS has established itself as one of the leading research institutes in China studying Judaism and Israeli affairs. The CJSS focuses its research on three academic fields: (1) the Shanghai Jewish Refugees (Holocaust refugees during World War II), (2) the remnants of Jewish communities in China (the largest of which are in Tianjin, Harbin and Kaifeng) and (3) political studies on the Near East. Amongst the publications of the CJSS are “The Jews of China”, “The Jewish Civilization”, “The Revitalization of the Jewish People” and “Jews in China: Legends, History and New Perspectives”. The CJSS has organized several national as well as international academic conferences along with so-called Rickshaw Reunions (reunions of Holocaust refugees who survived the Holocaust in Shanghai). Since 2006 the CJSS receives each year an Austrian Holocaust Memorial Servant from the Austrian Service Abroad. The Austrian Holocaust Memorial Servants‘ duties include: organizing Holocaust-related educational events, assisting the CJSS’ staff with organizing exhibitions and academic conferences, as well as translation and publication work and maintaining the CJSS’ archive. Providing tours for visitors of the CJSS and the Shanghai Jewish Refugees Museum (former Ohel Moshe Synagogue).
Nanjing - John Rabe and International Safety Zone Memorial Hall
The John Rabe and International Safety Zone Memorial Hall is one of the two Peace Service Partners of the Austrian Service Abroad. The Center was established to commemorate Rabe and his deep love of humanity, who saved over 600 Chinese refugees from the Japanese persecution. It is also intended to refresh people’s memories and let them learn about this chapter of Chinese history so that tragedies of this kind will never occur again. Moreover, the project is meant to promote world peace and humanitarianism everywhere, and to further develop friendly communications and cooperations among the Chinese people and other countries around the world. At the John Rabe House, the Peace Servant's main tasks are assistant and translation work, as well as self-dependent research and investigation. Furthermore, he or she aids in internal and external teamwork projects and in developing websites. Requirements for the Peace Service are good Chinese and English language skills, the ability to work self-dependent and to participate in international teamwork.

La Gamba - Tropical Field Station La Gamba
The biological station in La Gamba is an Austrian institution, which serves as a base for investigations for scientists from all over the world. Furthermore, the station started projects like the reforestation, the creation of environmental awareness and also projects to support the inhabitants. Our servants in La Gamba help to keep the station functional and collaborate in many of the named projects.
Finca Sonador - Finca Sonador

Osijek - Centre for Peace, Nonviolence and Human Rights

Prague - Federation of Jewish Communities

Oradour - Centre de la Mémoire d'Oradour
Paris - La Fondation pour la Mémoire de la Déportation
Paris - Amicale de Mauthausen  The Amicale de Mauthausen is a French institution in memory of the Mauthausen concentration camp and its many subcamps. Founded in october 1945 by survivors of the Mauthausen concentration camp the Amicale de Mauthausen is present at the annual camp liberation ceremonies in Austria and organizes    excursions for its members as well as for French high school students. The volunteers tasks include french-german translations of documents and assistance with the planning of excursions as well as the digitalization of the organizations archives.
Strasbourg - Congress of the Council of Europe, European Alliance of Cities and Regions for Roma Inclusion

Lambaréné - Medical Research Unit, Albert Schweitzer Hospital

Tbilisi - Act for Transformation Caucasus Office

Berchtesgaden - Dokumentation Obersalzberg
The Dokumentation Obersalzberg is a place of guided learning and remembrance designed by the Institut für Zeitgeschichte. At the Dokumentation Obersalzberg the Austrian Holocaust Memorial Servant works at the museum educational service. The main part of the work is the organisation of guided tours and workshops. He also gets the opportunity to create new educational material like workshops. 
Berlin - Jewish Museum Berlin
Berlin - Ecumenical Memorial Centre Plötzensee - Christians and Resistance
Cölbe - Terra Tech
Moringen -  Concentration Camp Memorial at Torhaus Moringen
Munich -  Jewish Museum Munich

Santa Rosita - ASOL Casa Hogar

Budapest - Tom Lantos Institute

Auroville - Auroville Action Group (AVAG)
Dharamsala - Nishtha - Rural Health, Education and Environment Center
Dharamsala - Tibetan Children´s Village
Dharmshala - Tibetan Welfare Office
Kochi - Mata Amritanandamayi Mission

Jerusalem - St. Vincent-Ein Kerem
Jerusalem - Yad Vashem
Tel Aviv - Wiener Library for the Study of the Nazi Era and the Holocaust

Milan - Centro di Documentazione Ebraica Contemporanea
Prato - Museo della Deportazione
Rome - Fondazione Museo della Shoah

Hiroshima - Peace Culture Foundation
The Hiroshima Peace Memorial Museum exhibit presents the facts of the atomic bombing, with the aim of contributing to the abolition of nuclear weapons throughout the world, and to achieve the world peace. The main tasks of the Austrian Peace Servant at the Hiroshima Peace Culture Foundation is assistant and translation work, self-dependent research and investigation, as well as internal and external teamwork projects. Requirements for the Peace Servant are good Japanese language skills, very good English language skills and the abilities to work self-dependent and participate in international teamwork.

Antalaha -  D'Analalava

Mexico City - Museo Memoria y Tolerancia

Marrakech - Atlas Foundation.org High Atlas Foundation

The Hague - Bertha von Suttner Peace Institute
The Hague - The Peace Palace
Amsterdam - UNITED for Intercultural Action
The main part of the Austrian Holocaust Memorial Servant at UNITED is secretarial work, which includes assisting, translating documents, doing self dependent research and investigation, as well as organising internal and external teamwork-projects. The Servant is engaged with organising conferences, administrating databases, publishing reports and preparing future projects.

Wellington - Holocaust Centre of New Zealand

Granada - Casa de los Tres Mundos

Lahore - SOS SOS Children's Village Association
Lahore - proLoka Pakistan

Lima - The information and education centre for the prevention of drug abuse CEDRO

Kraków -Judaica Foundation - Center For Jewish Culture
Kraków - PAH Polska Akcja Humanitarna
Kraków - Galicia Jewish Museum
Oświęcim - Auschwitz Jewish Center

Moscow - Russian Research and Educational Holocaust Center
Saint Petersburg - GU SRZ Vera

Kigali - Kigali Genocide Memorial

Cape Town - Cape Town Holocaust Centre
Durban - Durban Holocaust and Genocide Centre
Johannesburg - Johannesburg Holocaust and Genocide Centre

Stockholm - Forum för levande historia
Uppsala - Uppsala Universitet

Zurich - GAMARAAL Foundation

Kilis - Kareemat Merkez

Fort Portal - Mountains of the Moon University

Kyiv (Kiew) - Jewish Foundation of Ukraine (JFU)

London - Royal London Society for the Blind
London - The National Yad Vashem Charitable Trust
London - Institute of Contemporary History and Wiener Library

Dayton - Dayton International Peace Museum
Los Angeles - Simon Wiesenthal Center
The main part of the work of an Austrian Holocaust Memorial Servant at the Simon Wiesenthal Center is working as a tour guide in the Museum of Tolerance, which is the educational arm of the Simon Wiesenthal Center. These tour groups are mainly Middle School and High School students from the Los Angeles area, but also from further away. Besides from giving tours, the servant also helps out public visitors to the museum, helps with translations and interacts with Holocaust survivors as well.
Los Angeles - Los Angeles Museum of the Holocaust
The Austrian Holocaust Memorial Servant at the Los Angeles Museum of the Holocaust serves as tour guide, facilitates seminars and lectures by survivor docents, and works with teachero schedule and coordinate tours. The volunteer interacts with Holocaust survivors, students, teachers and visitors to the Museum on a daily basis. The servant also works with primary documents and artifacts, which he translates, reviews and interprets.
Los Angeles - USC Shoah Foundation Institute for Visual History and Education
The volunteer at "USC Shoah Foundation Institute" for Visual History and Education translates all types of different documents, from contracts to letters; he also helps to translate German terms or places which often appear in interviews with Holocaust Survivors. A main task for the Holocaust Servant is indexing German testimonies and maintaining the museum's database. Further, he helps the museum organizing different events like discussions or film screenings.
New York - The World Jewish Congress
New York - Museum of Jewish Heritage
At the Museum of Jewish Heritage, which tells the story of Jewish life before, during and after the Holocaust and also hosts galleries for special exhibitions, the Austrian Holocaust Memorial Servant works in the Collections & Exhibitions Department, where he is in charge of translating documents and other artifacts into English. Besides he listens to audio testimonies of Holocaust Survivors in either English or German and writes summaries, which are added to the museum's database. Further tasks include maintaining the database, guiding visitors, research and the installation of new exhibits.
New York - Anti-Defamation League
New York - American Jewish Committee
Reno - Center for Holocaust, Genocide & Peace Studies
Richmond - Virginia Holocaust Museum
The Virginia Holocaust Museum features 28 exhibitions including “The Ipson Saga,” which documents the story of Museum Director and Founder, Jay M. Ipson and his family from pre-war Lithuania, through their escape to liberation. The Nuremberg Trials Courtroom exhibition is the only existing replica of the famous courtroom that set the standard for modern international law. The tasks for the Austrian Holocaust Memorial Servant are manifold. Duties at the Virginia Holocaust Museum range from giving tours through the permanent exhibit to translations (German-English) to assisting in research or helping at the reception desk among other things.
San Francisco - Holocaust Center of Northern California
St. Petersburg - The Florida Holocaust Museum
Chicago - Illinois Holocaust Museum and Education Center
The Austrian Holocaust Memorial Servants help in the administration, assist in education, event planning and museum tours. Furthermore, they are responsible for translations between German and English. After having received special training they will also guide groups through the museum.

Austrian Holocaust Memorial Award

In 2006 Andreas Maislinger, chairman of the Austrian Service Abroad, initiated the Austrian Holocaust Memorial Award (AHMA). Winners:

2006: Pan Guang, Shanghai, PR China.

2007: Alberto Dines, Sao Paulo, Brazil

2008: Robert Hébras, Oradour-sur-Glane, France

2009: Jay M. Ipson, Richmond, Virginia, United States

2010: Eva Marks, Melbourne, Australia  

2011: Auschwitz Jewish Center, Oswiecim, Poland

2012: Ladislaus Löb, United Kingdom

2013: Hugo Höllenreiner, Munich, Germany

2014: Marģers Vestermanis, Riga, Latvia

2015: Erika Rosenberg, Buenos Aires, Argentina

2016: Giorgio Frassineti, Predappio (Forlì), Italy

2017: Ruben Fuks, Belgrade, Serbia

2018: Alla Gerber and Ilya Altman, Moscow, Russia

2019: Tomislav Dulic, Uppsala, Sweden

2020: Dušan Stefančič, Ljubljana, Slovenia

Austrian Servant Abroad of the Year 

2004 Stefan Stoev, United States Holocaust Memorial Museum, Washington DC, United States

2005 Dr. Andreas Daniel Matt, SOS Children's Villages Lahore, Pakistan

2006 Martin Wallner, Center of Jewish Studies Shanghai, China

2007 Daniel James Schuster, Yad Vashem Jerusalem, Israel

2008 René J. Laglstorfer, Centre de la mémoire d'Oradour, France & Center of Jewish Studies Shanghai, China

2009 Joerg Reitmaier, Auschwitz Jewish Center, Poland & Virginia Holocaust Museum, United States

2010 Peter Loibner, GU SRZ Vera, Russia

2011 Francesco Konigsberger, Federation of Jewish Communities, Czech Republic,
Cornelius Schwärzler, Russian Research and Educational Holocaust Center, Russia & Fondazione Museo della Shoa, Italy & Dokumentation Obersalzberg, Germany,
David Witzeneder, Tropical Field Station La Gamba & Finca Salvador, Costa Rica

2020 Jonathan Dorner, Holocaust Museum LA 
Monika Messner, Na’amat Kindertagesstätte

2021 Raphael Faul, Florian Müller, Matthias Kralupper, Haris Hadzimejlic, Raffael Winkler

Ethical Foundation
The core concept underlying the initiative of the Austrian Service Abroad is the concept of responsibility. Hereby the initiative is guided by the ethics conceptualized by the Jewish philosopher Hans Jonas who defined the following supreme moral imperative: "Act so that the effects of your action are compatible with the permanence of genuine human life". By integrating the chronological dimensions of past, present and future, in addition to the totality of humanity and the full dimension of space, the Austrian Service Abroad is about supporting life in an ethical, sustainable, global, responsible and permanent manner.

See also
Andreas Maislinger
Austrian Holocaust Memorial Service
Austrian Social Service
Austrian Peace Service
Austrian Holocaust Memorial Award
Ernst Florian Winter
House of Responsibility

References

External links
 Austrian Service Abroad Website
 House of Responsibility Website
 Radio Auslandsdienst (German)

Holocaust commemoration
Foreign relations of Austria
Non-profit organisations based in Austria
Organisations based in Innsbruck
Braunau am Inn
Student exchange
Organizations established in 1998
1998 establishments in Austria